Pedro Fleitas (born 11 July 1953) is a Paraguayan footballer. He played in nine matches for the Paraguay national football team from 1974 to 1979. He was also part of Paraguay's squad for the 1975 Copa América tournament.

References

External links
 

1953 births
Living people
Paraguayan footballers
Paraguay international footballers
Association football forwards
Club Libertad footballers
People from Itacurubí de la Cordillera
Independiente F.B.C. managers